Lesbian, gay, bisexual, and transgender (LGBT) affirming religious groups, otherwise referred to as gay-affirming religious groups, are religious groups that welcome LGBT people as their members, do not consider homosexuality as a sin or negative, and affirm LGBT rights and relationships. They include entire religious denominations, as well as individual congregations and places of worship. Some groups are mainly composed of non-LGBT members and they also have specific programs to welcome LGBT people into them, while other groups are mainly composed of LGBT members.

Abrahamic religions
Abrahamic religions (namely Judaism, Samaritanism, Christianity, the Baháʼí Faith, and Islam) have traditionally affirmed and endorsed a patriarchal and heteronormative approach towards human sexuality, favouring exclusively penetrative vaginal intercourse between men and women within the boundaries of marriage over all other forms of human sexual activity, including autoeroticism, masturbation, oral sex, non-penetrative and non-heterosexual sexual intercourse (all of which have been labeled as "sodomy" at various times), believing and teaching that such behaviors are forbidden because they're considered sinful, and further compared to or derived from the behavior of the alleged residents of Sodom and Gomorrah. However, the status of LGBT people in early Christianity and early Islam is debated.

In modern times, LGBT-affirming Christian denominations cite several reasons for their support of LGBT rights and relationships. Some argue that passages in the Bible never discuss LGBT relationships as they are known today. Others reject the belief in biblical inerrancy citing translation errors, biases, and other modern reinterpretations of biblical passages such as those seemingly supportive of slavery. Others argue that God created LGBT people, LGBT relationships produce good-fruit, and those relationships are therefore good or the fact that Jesus never addressed homosexuality but focused on messages of love. Similar interpretations have been applied to LGBT rights within Islam and Judaism.

Christianity

Several denominations with Christianity accept LGBT members, affirm LGBT relationships, and permit the ordination of openly LGBT candidates for their ministries. In addition to denominations many independent churches support LGBT members.

The following denominations accept same-sex unions to some degree:

 Anglicanism (See Homosexuality and Anglicanism): The Anglican Communion is divided over the issue of homosexuality. "The more liberal provinces that are open to changing Church doctrine on marriage in order to allow for same-sex unions include Brazil, Canada, New Zealand, Scotland, South India, South Africa, the US and Wales."
 Anglican Church in New Zealand: In 2014, the "General Synod passe[d] a resolution that will create a pathway towards the blessing of same-gender relationships, while upholding the traditional doctrine of marriage...It therefore says clergy should be permitted [while the blessings are being developed] 'to recognise in public worship' a same-gender civil union or state marriage of members of their faith community..." On a diocesan level, the Dunedin Diocese already permits a blessing for relationships irrespective of the partners' gender. "Blessings of same-sex relationships are offered in line with [Dunedin] Diocesan Policy and with the bishop's permission." In the Diocese of Auckland, a couple was "joined in a civil union at the inner-Auckland Anglican church of St Matthews in the City in 2005." The larger Anglican Church in Aotearoa, New Zealand and Polynesia allows priests to bless same-sex civil marriage or civil unions, but not to carry out same-sex marriage ceremonies in an Anglican church.
 Anglican Church of Australia: The church does not have an official position on homosexuality. In 2013, the Diocese of Perth voted to recognise same-sex relationships. The Social Responsibilities Committee of the Anglican Church Southern Queensland supported "the ability for same-sex couples to have a legally recognised ceremony to mark their union." The Diocese of Gippsland has appointed clergy in a "same-sex partnership." St. Andrew's Church in Subiaco, in Perth, has publicly blessed a same-sex union. In 2020, the church's highest court, the Appellate Tribunal, ruled that a diocese may authorise the blessing of persons in same-sex unions.
Anglican Church of Canada: In 2016, the Anglican Church of Canada voted to permit same-sex marriage after a vote recount. The motion must pass a second reading in 2019 to become church law. The dioceses of Niagara and Ottawa, both of which already allowed blessing rites, announced after the 2016 vote that they would immediately allow same-sex marriages. In 2019, the General Synod approved a resolution which allows each provincial synod and diocese to bless or perform same-sex marriages if they choose to do so. The Diocese of Toronto has specifically allowed churches to perform same-sex marriages as of mid-November 2016 when Archbishop Colin Johnson issued the Pastoral Guidelines for Same-Sex Marriages. In brief, the guidelines stated that such marriages could proceed in the Church "at the pastoral discretion of the Bishop and with the agreement of local clergy". At the same General Synod, a resolution, called "A Word to the Church", was approved that recognised that a diocese may choose to perform same-sex marriages.
Anglican Church of Southern Africa: Clergy are not permitted to enter in same-sex marriages or civil unions, but the church "tolerates same-sex relationships if they are celibate." Archbishop Thabo Makgoba, the current Anglican Primate, is "one among few church leaders in Africa to support same-sex marriage..." The Diocese of Saldanha Bay has proposed a blessing for same-sex unions. Famous anti-apartheid activist and theologian Desmond Tutu who is a former Archbishop within the Anglican Church of Southern Africa is a major advocate for gay rights and religious acceptance of LGBT individuals.
 Church in Wales: Clergy are allowed to enter into same-sex civil partnerships, and there is no requirement of sexual abstinence. In 2015, a majority of the General Synod of the Church in Wales voted for same-sex marriage. Also, the "Church has published prayers that may be said with a couple following the celebration of a civil partnership or civil marriage." In September 2021, the Church in Wales voted to "formally bless same-sex couples" instead (by way of debate and compromise) - but still not legally recognising same-sex marriage within titles of the Church officially.
 Church of England: Since 2005, clergy are permitted to enter into same-sex civil partnerships, but are requested to give assurances of following the Bishops' guidelines on human sexuality. In 2013, the House of Bishops announced that priests in same-sex civil unions may serve as bishops. As for ceremonies in church, "clergy in the Church of England are permitted to offer prayers of support on a pastoral basis for people in same-sex relationships; many priests already bless same-sex unions on an unofficial basis. Some congregations may offer "prayers for a same-sex commitment" or may "offer services of thanksgiving following a civil marriage ceremony."
 Episcopal Church (United States): At its 2015 triennial General Convention, the Episcopal Church voted overwhelmingly to allow religious weddings for same-sex couples. Many dioceses had previously allowed their priests to officiate at civil same-sex marriage ceremonies, but the church had not yet changed its own laws on marriage. The church law replaced the terms "husband" and "wife" with "the couple". Individual members of the clergy may still decline to perform same-sex weddings. Previously, the Episcopal Church had voted to allow a "generous pastoral response" for couples in same-sex civil unions, domestic partnerships, and marriages.
 Scottish Episcopal Church: Since 2008, St. Mary's Cathedral in Glasgow has offered blessing services for same-sex civil partnerships. The Scottish Episcopal Church agreed to bless same-sex marriages in 2015. In 2016, the General Synod voted to amend the marriage canon to include same-sex couples. The proposal was approved in a second reading in 2017, and same-sex marriages may be legally performed in the Scottish Episcopal Church.
Episcopal Anglican Church of Brazil voted, by an overwhelming majority, to amend to define marriage as a 'lifelong union between two people, regardless of sexual orientation or gender identity' thus permitting same-sex marriages within the church. 
 Baptists (See: Homosexuality and Baptist churches): Because some Baptist churches operate on a congregational level, some individual churches may recognize same-sex unions. Baptist churches which recognize same-sex unions include:
 Alliance of Baptists
 Association of Welcoming and Affirming Baptists
Cooperative Baptist Fellowship some but not all congregations allow same-sex marriage. 
 Latter Day Saint movement
 Community of Christ: In 2013, the Community of Christ officially decided to extend the sacrament of marriage to same-sex couples where gay marriage is legal, to provide covenant commitment ceremonies where it is not legal, and to allow the ordination of people in same-sex relationships to the priesthood. However, this is only in the United States, Canada, and Australia. The church does have a presence in countries where homosexuality is punishable by law, even death, so for the protection of the members in those nations, full inclusion of LGBT individuals is limited to the countries where this is not the case. Individual viewpoints do vary, and some congregations may be more welcoming than others. Furthermore, the church has proponents for support of both traditional marriage and same-sex marriages. The First Presidency and the Council of Twelve will need to approve policy revisions recommended by the USA National Conference.
 Lutheranism (See Homosexuality and Lutheranism):
 Church of Norway: In 2013, the bishops announced that they would allow "gay couples to receive church blessings for their civil unions..." In 2017, the Church of Norway decided to allow same-sex marriages to be performed in churches.
 Church of Sweden: On 22 October 2009, the governing board of the Church of Sweden voted 176–62 in favour of allowing its priests to wed same-sex couples in new gender-neutral church ceremonies, including the use of the term marriage.
 Evangelical Church in Germany (EKD): The EKD is a federation of twenty Protestant churches in Germany. The blessing of same-sex unions is allowed in many constituent member churches.
 Evangelical Lutheran Church in America: During its 2009 Churchwide Assembly the ELCA passed a resolution by a vote of 619–402 reading "Resolved, that the ELCA commit itself to finding ways to allow congregations that choose to do so to recognize, support and hold publicly accountable lifelong, monogamous, same-gender relationships."
Evangelical Lutheran Church in Canada permits same-sex marriages. 
 Evangelical Lutheran Church in Denmark: In 2012, the Danish parliament voted to make same-sex marriages mandatory in all state churches. Individual priests may refuse to perform the ceremony, but the local bishop must organize a replacement.
 Evangelical Lutheran Church of Finland: The church does not currently allow same-sex marriages to be legally officiated in churches. However, couples may enter in a civil partnership and "the couple may organise prayers with a priest or other church workers and invited guests. This may take place on church premises – but practice varies from parish to parish." After a civil same-sex marriage, couples may request the same prayers in church. "All of the bishops have taken the position that it is possible to hold prayer services to bless same-sex couples."
 Federation of Swiss Protestant Churches: This is a group of 26 member churches. Several of its member churches permit prayer services and blessings of same-sex civil unions.
 Protestant Church in the Netherlands: The church has allowed the blessing of same-sex unions since 2001. This has included the blessing of same-sex unions as well as marriages.
 The United Protestant Church of France authorized the blessing of same-sex unions by pastors in May 2015, two years after the government legalized same-sex marriages. Individual vicars may refuse to perform same-sex marriage ceremonies.
The Evangelical Church of the Augsburg Confession in Austria permits same-sex marriages.
The Church of Iceland permits same-sex marriages. 
The Evangelical Lutheran Church of Finland permits same-sex couples may prayer ceremonies within the church but does not permit actual marriage.
The Union of Evangelical Churches in Germany allows for the blessing of same-sex marriages.
The Lutheran Evangelical Church in Italy permits same-sex marriages
 The Metropolitan Community Church performs same-sex marriages. The MCC was founded to support LGBT Christians. In 1968, MCC founder Rev. Troy Perry officiated the first public same-sex marriage ceremony in the United States, though it was not legally recognized at the time.
 Methodism
 Methodist Church of Great Britain: Permits same-sex marriage. Clergy are allowed to enter into same-sex civil partnerships or marriages.
 Methodist Church of New Zealand: Clergy may enter into same-sex unions and permits same-sex marriages.
 Methodist Church of Southern Africa: In Southern Africa, the Methodist Church has allowed clergy in same-sex relationships, but they are not permitted to be in a same-sex marriage. The Methodist "Church allowed [clergy] to be in a homosexual relationship whilst being a minister, and allowed [clergy] to stay in the Church's manse with [their] partner, but drew the line at recognising [their] same-sex marriage." "The Methodist Church 'tolerates homosexuals' and even accepts same-sex relationships (as long as such relationships are not solemnised by marriage)..."
Many of the Protestant Church of Switzerland churches permit blessings for same-sex couples.
The Evangelical Methodist Church in Argentina allows "the freedom to accompany homosexual couples" in ministry.
The Evangelical Church in Uruguay, a Methodist denomination, has "resolved that pastors that wish to minister to homosexuals may do so freely". Each pastor is free to provide blessing services for same-sex unions if he or she chooses to do so.
 National Council of Churches in India leadership has expressed support for LGBT rights.
 Old Catholic Church: A group of churches which separated from Roman Catholicism over the issue of papal authority.
 Many American Old Catholic churches perform same-sex marriage ceremonies including American Apostolic Church, Catholic Apostolic Church in North America, Ecumenical Catholic Communion, American Catholic Church in the United States, American Catholic Church Diocese, and the National Catholic Church of America.
 The Union of Utrecht of the Old Catholic Churches is a federation of six European Old Catholic organizations, four of which allow same-sex marriage ceremonies.
 Presbyterianism (See Homosexuality and Presbyterianism):
 Church of Scotland: In 2015, the Kirk voted to allow congregations to ordain clergy who enter into same-sex civil partnerships. The General Assembly voted to allow clergy in same-sex marriages in 2016. Then, the General Assembly approved draft legislation that would allow ministers of Word and Sacrament and deacons to marry same-sex couples if they wish for further consideration of the general assemble and membership.
 The Presbyterian Church (USA), the largest Presbyterian group in the United States, voted to allow same-gender marriages on 19 June 2014. This vote allows pastors to perform marriages in jurisdictions where same-sex marriages are legally recognized. Additionally, the Assembly voted to send out a proposed amendment to the Book of Order, changing the description of marriage from "between a man and a woman" to "between two people, traditionally between a man and a woman." This amendment needed to be approved by a majority of the 172 Presbyteries to take effect. On 17 March 2015, the New Jersey-based Presbytery of the Palisade became the 87th presbytery to approve the ratification, making the change official.
In 2011, the United Reformed Church allowed blessings of same-sex couples. In July 2016, the United Reformed Church allowed same-sex marriage.
 Quakerism (See Homosexuality and Quakerism)
 The Canadian Yearly Meeting supports the right of same-sex couples to marry.
 Several American, British, and Australian Quaker groups bless same-sex marriages.
 Rainbow Catholics India now has representation at Mumbai, Goa, and Bangalore
 United Church of Canada: The General Council of the church accepts same-sex marriages. However, each individual congregation is free to develop its own marriage policies.
 United Church of Christ: In 2005, the General Synod adopted a resolution supporting equal access to marriage for all couples, regardless of gender. This resolution encouraged (but did not require) individual congregations to adopt policies supporting equal marriage rights for same-sex couples.
Philippine Independent Church is LGBT supportive and acknowledges past homophonic wrongs through their statement "Our Common Humanity, Our Shared Dignity"
United Protestant Church in Belgium permits same-sex marriage.
The Waldensian Evangelical Church permits same-sex marriage.
The Swiss Reformed Church permits same-sex marriage. 
The Mennonite Church in the Netherlands offers marriage to both heterosexual and same-gender couples.
The Mennonite Church Canada offers marriage to both heterosexual and same-gender couples.
Each congregation within the Christian Church (Disciples of Christ) is permitted to determine if would like to perform same-sex marriages.
Parts of the Moravian Church permits same-sex marriage.
Unity Church is fully LGBT-affirming.
United Church of Christ in the Philippines supports LGBT rights and inclusion.
The Uniting Reformed Church in Southern Africa permits same-sex marriage
The Church of South India has many members and clergy that support same-sex marriages.

A number of Christian ministries seek to create officially sanctioned "safe-spaces" in a similar vein as gay–straight alliances in various schools.

Unitarian Universalism

Unitarian Universalism has a long-standing tradition of welcoming LGBTQ+ people. The official position of the Unitarian Universalist Association (UUA) states that "Each of us has worth and dignity, and that worth includes our gender and our sexuality. As Unitarian Universalists (UUs), we not only open our doors to people of all sexual orientations and gender identities, we value diversity of sexuality and gender and see it as a spiritual gift. We create inclusive religious communities and work for LGBTQ justice and equity as a core part of who we are. All of who you are is sacred. All of who you are is welcome."

The first ceremony of union performed by a UU minister for a same-gender couple was reportedly done in the late 1950s. It became more commonplace in the late 1970s and early 1980s. The UUA has been ordaining people regardless of sexual orientation since the 1970s, and the first openly transgender person was ordained in 1988. The UUA expects all ministers to show ministerial competency in the area of human sexuality before being approved for ordination. In 2004 the UUA President's Freedom to Marry Fund was launched. In 2009 Standing on the Side of Love was launched, a public advocacy campaign that seeks to harness love's power to stop oppression. The campaign provides a platform for freedom to marry efforts, among other causes.

Judaism

The American branch of Conservative Judaism formally approves of same-sex marriage ceremonies. As of 1992 with the Report of the Reconstructionist Commission on Homosexuality, the Reconstructionist Movement of Judaism has expressed its support for same-sex marriages as well as the inclusion of gay and lesbian people in all aspects of Jewish life. The Jewish Reconstructionist Federation leaves the choice of whether or not to perform same-sex marriages to individual rabbis but the procedure is included in the Reconstructionist Rabbi's Manual and many choose to use the traditional language and symbols of kiddushin. Reform Judaism, the largest Jewish denomination in the United States, is generally supportive of LGBT rights and marriage.

Islam

Attitudes toward LGBTQ+ people and their experiences in the Muslim world have been influenced by its religious, legal, social, political, and cultural history. The religious stigma and sexual taboo associated with homosexuality in Islamic societies can have profound effects for those Muslims who self-identify as LGBTQ+. Today, most LGBTQ-affirming Islamic organizations and individual congregations are primarily based in the Western world and South Asian countries; they usually identify themselves with the liberal and progressive movements within Islam.

Homosexual acts are forbidden in traditional Islamic jurisprudence and are liable to different punishments, including flogging, stoning, and the death penalty, depending on the situation and legal school. However, homosexual relationships were generally tolerated in pre-modern Islamic societies, and historical records suggest that these laws were invoked infrequently, mainly in cases of rape or other "exceptionally blatant infringement on public morals". Public attitudes toward homosexuality in the Muslim world underwent a marked negative change starting from the 19th century through the global spread of Islamic fundamentalist movements such as Salafism and Wahhabism, and the influence of the sexual notions and restrictive norms prevalent in Europe at the time: a number of Muslim-majority countries have retained criminal penalties for homosexual acts enacted under European colonial rule. In recent times, extreme prejudice, discrimination, and violence against LGBT people persists, both socially and legally, in much of the Muslim world, exacerbated by increasingly socially conservative attitudes and the rise of Islamist movements in Muslim-majority countries. There are laws against homosexual sexual activities in a large number of Muslim-majority countries, which prescribe the death penalty in a limited number of them.

In France there was an Islamic same-sex marriage on February 18, 2012. In Paris, in November 2012, a room in a Buddhist prayer hall was used by gay Muslims and called a "gay-friendly mosque", and a French Islamic website is supporting religious same-sex marriage. The Ibn Ruschd-Goethe mosque in Berlin is a liberal mosque open to all types of Muslims, where men and women pray together and LGBT worshippers are welcomed and supported. Other significant LGBT-inclusive mosques or prayer groups include the El-Tawhid Juma Circle Unity Mosque in Toronto, Masjid an-Nur al-Isslaah (Light of Reform Mosque) in Washington D.C., Masjid Al-Rabia in Chicago, Unity Mosque in Atlanta, People's Mosque in Cape Town South Africa, Masjid Ul-Umam mosque in Cape Town, Qal'bu Maryamin in California, and the Nur Ashki Jerrahi Sufi Community in New York City.

Muslims for Progressive Values, based in the United States and Malaysia, is "a faith-based, grassroots, human rights organization that embodies and advocates for the traditional Qur'anic values of social justice and equality for all, for the 21st Century." MPV has recorded "a lecture series that seeks to dismantle the religious justification for homophobia in Muslim communities." The lectures can be viewed at MPV Lecture Series. The Mecca Institute is an LGBT-inclusive and progressive online Islamic seminary, and serves as an online center of Islamic learning and research.

Dharmic religions

Buddhism

According to the Pāli Canon and Āgama (the early Buddhist scriptures), there is nothing saying that same or opposite gender relations have anything to do with sexual misconduct, and some Theravādin Buddhist monks express that same-gender relations do not violate the rule to avoid sexual misconduct, which means not having sex with people under age (thus protected by their parents or guardians), someone betrothed or married, and those who have taken vows of religious celibacy.

Views on homosexuality and LGBT rights differ in the Buddhist tradition. However, many Buddhist leaders and groups have been historically supportive and continue to be supportive of LGBT people. The renowned Thiền Buddhist master, Thích Nhất Hạnh, remarked that the spirit of Buddhism is inclusiveness and states that "when you look at the ocean, you see different kinds of waves, many sizes and shapes, but all the waves have water as their foundation and substance. If you are born gay or lesbian, your ground of being in the same as mine. We are different, but we share the same ground of being." Thus Plum Village, founded by Thích Nhất Hạnh and Chân Không, and many of the sanghas within the Plum Village tradition, are LGBT-affirming. Some efforts within engaged Buddhism include LGBT rights.

Japan's culture and major religions don't have a history of hostility towards homosexuality. Same-sex marriages are performed at Shunkō-in, a Rinzai Zen Buddhist temple in Kyoto, Japan. Shozenji Temple in Moriguchi City, Osaka is also LGBT affirming and includes a shrine to Guanyin who is said to have no gender or may change genders to best provide compassion to those in need. Some modern Buddhist leaders were active in the movement for same-sex marriage rights in Taiwan, which legalized same-sex marriages in 2019. Hsing Yun, founder of the Fo Guang Shan Buddhist order, has called for tolerance towards the LGBT community. Some adherents of the Navayāna (Ambedkarite) Buddhist tradition are supporting LGBT rights within their larger activist activities. In Thailand, some leaders in the Theravāda tradition including Phra Payom Kalayano have expressed support for LGBT rights.

In 1997, the 14th Dalai Lama Tenzin Gyatso declared: "From a Buddhist point of view, men-to-men and women-to-women is generally considered sexual misconduct." However, this view expressed by the Dalai Lama is not based on the teachings of Gautama Buddha but derived from some later Abhidharma texts. Moreover, the Dalai Lama has repeatedly "voiced his support for the full recognition of human rights for all people, regardless of sexual orientation." In the most recent interview with the Dalai Lama on this topic (March 10, 2014), the Dalai Lama said gay marriage is "OK", provided it's not in contradiction with the values of one's chosen religion. Also in the Tibetan tradition, the Nalandabodhi sangha has stated that they are welcoming of all sexual orientations and well-known Bhutanese lama Khyentse Norbu has expressed support for LGBT rights in Bhutan.

In Western Buddhist denominations, there is widescale support for LGBT rights from Buddhist groups and organizations, including the European Buddhist Union, the Buddhist Churches of America, many Shin Buddhist groups, and Zen leaders such as Thích Nhất Hạnh. The Federation of Australian Buddhist Councils (FABC), representing Buddhist laypeople, and the Australian Sangha Association vocally supported same-sex marriage in Australia. Soka Gakkai International-USA (SGI-USA) is the most diverse Buddhist community in the United States with more than 500 chapters and some 100 centers throughout the country supports LGBT rights. The Buddhist Church of San Francisco first performed a gay marriage ceremony in the 1970s. American Soka Gakkai Buddhists have performed same-sex union ceremonies since the 1990s. In a PEW research poll, 88% of American Buddhists stated that homosexuality should be accepted. This was a higher level of support than any other religious group studied.

Hinduism

There is no central authority to speak on behalf of all Hindus and, therefore, each Sampradaya, temple, and religious leader may have differing opinions. The Gay & Lesbian Vaishnava Association is a nonprofit religious organization offering positive information and support to LGBTQI Vaishnavas and Hindus more generally The Hindu American Foundation (HAF) states that one of Hinduism's core teachings is that every being is Divine or a reflection of Divine qualities, regardless of one's outer attributes. HAF states that this and other fundamental and ancient Hindu teachings may allow Hindus to more openly embrace LGBT rights and marriage equality. HAF supports marriage equality for all Americans and submitted amicus briefs in various U.S. courts, including the U.S. Supreme Court, to this end. Anil Bhanot, general secretary of The United Kingdom Hindu Council said: "The point here is that the homosexual nature is part of the natural law of God; it should be accepted for what it is, no more and no less. Hindus are generally conservative but it seems to me that in ancient India, they even celebrated sex as an enjoyable part of procreation, where priests were invited for ceremonies in their home to mark the beginning of the process." Many queer-affirming Hindus look to LGBT themes in Hindu mythology and LGBT content in pre-modern Indian as reasons to support and celebrate LGBT people.

Sikhism

As individuals, many Sikhs support LGBT rights, civil partnerships, and same sex marriage because of the religion's emphasis on justice and equality. Civil partnerships and same sex marriage are not banned in the Guru Granth Sahib. LGBT-affirming Sikhs point to the Sikh belief that marriage is a union of souls. In Sikhism, the soul is seen as genderless, and the outward appearance of human beings (man, woman) is a temporary state.

While not a denomination, the organization Sarbat is a mixture of both practicing and non-practicing Sikhs with a focus on LGBT rights. The core ethics of the group include the concept of Seva (selfless service), treating others with equality and respect, acknowledgement of the five fundamental human qualities Gurus extensively advocated of Sat (truth), Daya (compassion), Santokh (contentment), Nimrata (humility), and Pyaar (love), and confidentiality and discretion.

Eastern and Southeast Asian religions

Chinese folk religion

Tu'er Shen, also known as the Rabbit God, is a gay Chinese deity. In 2006, Lu Wei-ming founded a temple for Tu'er Shen and Taoist worship in Yonghe District in the New Taipei City in Taiwan. About 9,000 pilgrims visit the temple each year praying for a suitable (same-sex) partner. The Wei-ming temple also performs love ceremonies for gay couples. It is the world's only religious shrine for homosexuals.

Confucianism
Homosexuality is not mentioned in the Analects of Confucius.

Shinto

Historically, Shinto "had no special code of morals and seems to have regarded sex as a natural phenomenon to be enjoyed with few inhibitions." While Shinto beliefs are diverse, Japanese Shinto doesn't condemn homosexuality, and the formally organized Konkokyo sect is fully affirming. Multiple Shinto leaders advocated in support of gay marriage in Hawaii.

Taoism 

In a similar way to Buddhism, Taoist schools sought throughout history to define what would be sexual misconduct. The precept against Sexual Misconduct is sex outside your marriage. The married spouses usually in Chinese suggest male with female, though the scripture itself does not explicitly say anything against same-gender relations. Many sorts of precepts mentioned in the Yunji Qiqian, The Mini Daoist Canon, does not explicitly say anything against same-gender relations as well. Homosexuality is not unknown in Taoist history, such as during the Tang dynasty when Taoist nuns exchanged love poems.

Indigenous religions

African Continental religions 

Traditionally, the Meru culture included people called "Mugwe", who served spiritual roles and who were often homosexual and could marry other men. Several pre-colonial religious and cultural groups across the continent permitted non-heterosexual relationships or gender identities outside of the modern western gender binary.

African Diasporic religions

Candomblé 
Within Candomblé, a syncretic religion founds primarily found in Brazil, there is widespread (though not universal) support for gay rights, many members are LGBT, and have performed gay marriages.

Haitain Vodou 
Homosexuality is religiously acceptable in Haitian Vodou. The lwa or loa (spirits) Erzulie Dantor and Erzulie Freda are often associated with and viewed as protectors of queer people. The lao Ghede Nibo is sometimes depicted as an effeminate drag queen and inspires those he inhabits to lascivious sexuality of all kinds.

Santería 
Practitioners of Santería, primarily found in Cuba,  generally (though not universally) welcome LGBT members and include them in religious or ritual activities.

Umbanda 
Also a Brazilian syncretic religion, Umbanda houses generally support LGBT rights and have performed gay marriages.

Ancient Mesopotamian religion 

Individuals who went against the traditional gender binary were heavily involved in the cult of Inanna, an ancient Mesopotamian goddess. During Sumerian times, a set of priests known as gala worked in Inanna's temples, where they performed elegies and lamentations. Men who became gala sometimes adopted female names and their songs were composed in the Sumerian eme-sal dialect, which, in literary texts, is normally reserved for the speech of female characters. Some Sumerian proverbs seem to suggest that gala had a reputation for engaging in anal sex with men. During the Akkadian Period, kurgarrū and assinnu were servants of Ishtar who dressed in female clothing and performed war dances in Ishtar's temples. Several Akkadian proverbs seem to suggest that they may have also had homosexual proclivities. Gwendolyn Leick, an anthropologist known for her writings on Mesopotamia, has compared these individuals to the contemporary Indian hijra. In one Akkadian hymn, Ishtar is described as transforming men into women. Some modern pagans include Inanna in their worship.

Burmese folk religion 

Many Nat Kadaws in traditional Burmese folk religion are members of the LGBT community.

Đạo Mẫu 

In Vietnam, many LGBT people find a safe community within the Đạo Mẫu religion which is worship on the mother god. Many LGBT people act as mediums during Đạo Mẫu rituals.

Indonesian religions 

Among the Saʼadan (eastern Toraja) in the island of Sulawesi (Celebes), Indonesia, there are shamans who do not fit into the western gender binary. Many within the Bugis society recognize five genders: makkunrai, oroané, bissu, calabai, and calalai. Historically, the bissu gender often played religious roles though modern discrimination has reduced the number of bissu religious leaders.

Pre-colonial religions of the Americas 

Among the Indigenous peoples of the Americas prior to the European colonization, many Nations had respected ceremonial, religious, and social roles for homosexual, bisexual, and gender-nonconforming individuals in their communities and in many contemporary Native American and First Nations communities, these roles still exist. Homosexual and gender-variant individuals were also common among other pre-conquest civilizations in Latin America, such as the Aztecs, Mayans, Quechuas, Moches, Zapotecs, and the Tupinambá of Brazil and were accepted in their various religions.

It is important to note that the indigenous peoples of the Americas includes hundreds of cultures with varying views on sex, gender, and spirituality. Additionally, first nations and indigenous views on gender and sexuality may not fall within modern western categorizations of sex and gender.

Pre-colonial religions of the Philippines 

Filipino shamans, often known as babaylan held positions of authority as religious leaders or healers in some precolonial Philippine societies. Cross-dressing or non-gender conforming males sometimes took on the role of the female babaylan. Early historical accounts record the existence of male babaylans who wore female clothes and took the demeanor of a woman. Anatomy was not the only basis for gender. Being male or female was based primarily on occupation, appearance, actions and sexuality. A male babaylan could partake in romantic and sexual relations with other men without being judged by society. A small number of Filipinos practice local indigenous religions today.

Traditional religions of Pacific Islands 
In Native Hawaiian and Tahitian cultures there are third gender people called māhū with traditional spiritual and social roles within the culture. The term is similar to the Tongan  and Samoan  who were accepted in the traditional pre-colonial religions of their societies.

New religious movements
Since the beginning of the sexual liberation movement in the Western world, which coincided with second-wave feminism and the women's liberation movement initiated in the early 1960s, new religious movements and alternative spiritualities such as Modern Paganism and the New Age began to grow and spread across the globe alongside their intersection with the sexual liberation movement and the counterculture of the 1960s, and exhibited characteristic features, such as the embrace of alternative lifestyles, unconventional dress, rejection of Abrahamic religions and their conservative social mores, use of cannabis and other recreational drugs, relaxed attitude, sarcastic humble or self-imposed poverty, and laissez-faire sexual behavior. The sexual liberation movement was aided by feminist ideologues in their mutual struggle to challenge traditional ideas regarding female sexuality, male sexuality, and queer sexuality. Elimination of undue favorable bias towards men and objectification of women, as well as support for women's right to choose their sexual partners free of outside interference or societal judgment, were three of the main goals associated with sexual liberation from the feminist perspective.

Antoinism
Antoinism, a new religious movement founded in Belgium in 1910, does not provide any prescription on issues such as sexuality, as it considers that this is not related to spirituality; homosexuality is not deemed a sin and there is nothing wrong to be gay and antoinist.

Eckankar
Eckankar, an American new religious movement founded by Paul Twitchell in 1965, says on its website that "where legally recognized, same-sex marriages are performed, in the form of the ECK Wedding Ceremony, by ordained ministers of Eckankar".

Modern Paganism
Most Neopagan religions have the theme of fertility (both physical and creative/spiritual) as central to their practices, and as such encourage what they view as a healthy sex life, consensual sex between adults, regardless of gender.

Heathenry, a modern Germanic Pagan movement, includes several pro-LGBT groups. Some groups legitimize openness toward LGBT practitioners by reference to the gender-bending actions of Thor and Odin in Norse mythology. There are, for instance, homosexual and transgender members of The Troth, a prominent U.S. Heathen organisation. Many Heathen groups in Northern Europe perform same-sex marriages, and a group of self-described "Homo-Heathens" marched in the 2008 Stockholm Pride carrying a statue of the Norse god Freyr. Research found a greater proportion of LGBT practitioners within Heathenry (21%) than wider society, although noted that the percentage was lower than in other forms of modern Paganism.

Wicca, like other religions, has adherents with a broad spectrum of views, ranging from conservative to liberal. It is a largely nondogmatic religion and has no prohibitions against sexual intercourse outside of marriage or relationships between members of the same sex. The religion's ethics are largely summed up by the Wiccan Rede: "An it harm none, do as thou wilt", which is interpreted by many as allowing and endorsing responsible sexual relationships of all varieties. Specifically in the Wiccan tradition of modern witchcraft, one of the widely accepted pieces of Craft liturgy, the Charge of the Goddess instructs that "...all acts of love and pleasure are [the Goddess'] rituals", giving validity to all forms of sexual activity for Wiccan practitioners.

In the Gardnerian and Alexandrian forms of Wicca, the "Great Rite" is a sex ritual much like the hieros gamos, performed by a priest and priestess who are believed to embody the Wiccan God and Goddess. The Great Rite is almost always performed figuratively using the athame and chalice as symbols of the penis and vagina. The literal form of the ritual is always performed by consenting adults, by a couple who are already lovers and in private. The Great Rite is not seen as an opportunity for casual sex.

Neo-Druidism
The Order of Bards, Ovates and Druids is a worldwide group dedicated to practicing, teaching, and developing modern Druidry and has more than 25,000 members in 50 countries. The Order is LGBT-affirming within a larger framework of support for civil rights, love of justice, and the love of all existences.

Raëlism

Raëlism, an international new religious movement and UFO religion which was founded in France in 1974, promotes a positive outlook towards human sexuality, including homosexuality. Its founder Raël recognised same-sex marriage, and a Raëlian press release stated that sexual orientation is genetic and it also likened discrimination against gay people to racism. Some Raëlian leaders have performed licensed same-sex marriages.

Santa Muerte
The cult of Santa Muerte is a new religious movement centered on the worship of Santa Muerte, a cult image, female deity, and folk saint which is popularly revered in Mexican Neopaganism and folk Catholicism. A personification of death, she is associated with healing, protection, and safe delivery to the afterlife by her devotees. Santa Muerte is also revered and seen as a saint and protector of the lesbian, gay, bisexual, transgender, and queer (LGBTQ+) communities in Mexico, since LGBTQ+ people are considered and treated as outcasts by the Catholic Church, evangelical churches, and Mexican society at large. Many LGBTQ+ people ask her for protection from violence, hatred, disease, and to help them in their search for love. Her intercession is commonly invoked in same-sex marriage ceremonies performed in Mexico. The Iglesia Católica Tradicional México-Estados Unidos, also known as the Church of Santa Muerte, recognizes gay marriage and performs religious wedding ceremonies for homosexual couples. According to R. Andrew Chesnut, Ph.D. in Latin American history and professor of Religious studies, the cult of Santa Muerte is the single fastest-growing new religious movement in the Americas.

Satanism
In both of the two primary mainstream Satanist denominations, sex is viewed as an indulgence, but one that should only be freely entered into with consent. The Satanic Temple appears to be more vocally supportive of the LGBTQIA+ community. Satanists from The Satanic Temple are pluralists, accepting bisexuals, lesbians, gays, transgender people, BDSM, and polyamorists. On July 14, 2013, The Satanic Temple travelled to the Mississippi gravesite of the mother of Westboro Baptist Church founder, Fred Phelps. They performed a 'pink mass' ritual, aiming to make Phelps believe that The Satanic Temple had "turned his mother gay".

LaVeyan Satanism is critical of Abrahamic sexual mores, considering them narrow, restrictive and hypocritical. The Eleven Satanic Rules of the Earth which are specific to the Church of Satan, only give two instructions regarding sex: "Do not make sexual advances unless you are given the mating signal" and "Do not harm little children", though the latter is much broader and encompasses physical and other abuse. This has been a consistent part of Church of Satan policy since its inception in 1966.
In a 2004 essay supporting same-sex marriage:Though the Church of Satan began marketing an anti-equality polo shirt in March 2015 just 3 months before the Supreme Court legalized gay marriage, to the criticism of some, their site states that their purpose in doing so was to ″embrace the stratified & Darwinian reality of Nature to encourage strength, self-improvement & the mastery of diverse skills.″

Theistic Satanists also oppose homophobia.

Wicca

Many Wiccans are generally welcoming of LGBTQ+ people. Wiccans tend to view sex in a positive light without guilt. Some strands of Wicca go beyond welcoming queer people and actively celebrate gay relationships.

See also

References

External links

 LGBTQ Humanists
 

LGBT and religion
Organizations that support LGBT people